This is a list of public art in North Ayrshire, one of the 32 local government council areas of Scotland. This list applies only to works of public art on permanent display in an outdoor public space and does not, for example, include artworks in museums.

Ardrossan

Beith

Fairlie

Great Cumbrae

Irvine

Isle of Arran

Kilwinning

Largs

References

North Ayrshire
Outdoor sculptures in Scotland
Statues in Scotland